Daniel Howe (born 4 December 1995) is an Australian rules footballer who plays for  in the Australian Football League (AFL).

Early career 
Growing up in Yarrawonga, Howe joined his elder brother and played most of his junior years playing for Rennie. Howe spent his schooling as a boarder at Xavier College, he would often go home and play with Rennie in the Hume Football League.

AFL Career

Hawthorn (2015–2022) 
After Hawthorn won the 2014 premiership the Hawthorn recruitment officer concentrated on the younger players in the 2014 AFL Draft.  Howe was a 2nd round selection (Hawthorn) No. 31 overall.

A mobile defender, Howe made his AFL debut in the ninth round of the 2015 season. On a wet day in Launceston he started as the sub before replacing Cyril Rioli at three quarter time.

In November 2015, Howe extended his contract to play for Hawthorn for an additional two years.

In July 2018, Howe received a five-game ban for his conduct in a Round 18 game against Carlton. He was given a two-game ban for striking Patrick Cripps and a three-game ban for a tripping incident that left Zac Fisher with a broken leg.

On 30 October 2018, Howe signed a two-year deal with Hawthorn.

After 96 games, Howe was told he would not be offered another contract for 2023 season. Hawthorn delisted him.

North Melbourne (2023 - )

Howe was selected by North Melbourne in the 2023 rookie draft with selection 33.

Statistics
Updated to the end of the 2022 season.

|-
| 2015 ||  || 41
| 4 || 0 || 1 || 28 || 23 || 51 || 20 || 11 || 0.0 || 0.3 || 7.0 || 5.8 || 12.8 || 5.0 || 2.8 || 0
|- 
| 2016 ||  || 41
| 11 || 1 || 2 || 96 || 60 || 156 || 40 || 50 || 0.1 || 0.2 || 8.7 || 5.5 || 14.2 || 3.6 || 4.6 || 0
|-
| 2017 ||  || 17
| 18 || 5 || 2 || 151 || 149 || 300 || 72 || 96 || 0.3 || 0.1 || 8.4 || 8.3 || 16.7 || 4.0 || 5.3 || 0
|-
| 2018 ||  || 17
| 17 || 4 || 2 || 165 || 138 || 303 || 80 || 82 || 0.2 || 0.1 || 9.7 || 8.1 || 17.8 || 4.7 || 4.8 || 0
|-
| 2019 ||  || 17
| 12 || 1 || 2 || 111 || 83 || 194 || 53 || 44 || 0.1 || 0.2 || 9.3 || 6.9 || 16.2 || 4.4 || 3.7 || 0
|-
| 2020 ||  || 17
| 5 || 2 || 0 || 36 || 17 || 53 || 16 || 5 || 0.4 || 0.0 || 7.2 || 3.4 || 10.6 || 3.2 || 1.0 || 0
|-
| 2021 ||  || 17
| 20 || 8 || 5 || 249 || 124 || 373 || 109 || 40 || 0.4 || 0.3 || 12.5 || 6.2 || 18.7 || 5.5 || 2.0 || 0
|-
| 2022 ||  || 17
| 9 || 1 || 1 || 74 || 50 || 124 || 40 || 16 || 0.1 || 0.1 || 8.2 || 5.6 || 13.8 || 4.4 || 1.8 || 0
|- class="sortbottom"
! colspan=3| Career
! 96 !! 22 !! 15 !! 910 !! 644 !! 1554 !! 430 !! 344 !! 0.2 !! 0.2 !! 9.5 !! 6.7 !! 16.2 !! 4.5 !! 3.6 !! 0
|}

Notes

Honours and achievements
Team
 Minor premiership: 2015

Individual
  best first year player (debut season): 2015

References

External links

 

Living people
1995 births
Hawthorn Football Club players
Box Hill Football Club players
Murray Bushrangers players
Australian rules footballers from Victoria (Australia)